The Sierra Ancha Cliff Dwellings are a series of Pre-Columbian native American cliff-dwellings located in the Sierra Ancha Wilderness. They were built between 1280 and 1350, likely by the Salado people. The Sierra Ancha is home to several prominent ruin sites known as the Devil's Chasm Fortress, the Canyon Creek Ruins, the Pueblo Canyon Ruins, the Cold Springs Canyon Ruins, and the Cooper Forks Canyon Ruins. Collectively they have been called the Cherry Creek Ruins.

See also
 Cliff Palace
 Montezuma's Castle
 Cherry Creek Campaign
 List of the oldest buildings in Arizona

References

Cliff dwellings
Ancient Puebloan archaeological sites in Arizona